Arattana may refer to:
 Arattana (7°13'N 80°34'E), a village in Sri Lanka
 Arattana (7°22'N 80°43'E), a village in Sri Lanka